Cult Critic Movie Awards is an IMDb Award listing live screening award event that takes place in Kolkata and features art-house cult films from across the world. The Cult Critic Films Magazine started this award event in 2017 in Kolkata.

The JEAN LUC GODARD AWARDS is given out each year for significant movies and people in a variety of categories.

Awardees 
The award is given out each year for significant movies and people in a variety of categories.

2022
The Saviour Brig. Pritam Singh
Denna-The Wings
Guy Kent for the film "The Atomic Dream"
Hélène Cardona for the film "Halo"
Angad Aulakh best director for "The Atomic Dream"
Thomas Edward Seymour best director documentory for "VHS Massacre Too"

2021 
Dari Yeyya Vaikuntake
Adhure Poore Se Hum
The loneliness of those who do not exist
Zachary James for the film The Raven

2020 
Thaen
Dafan

2019 
Teen Kanya
Silvia de Leonardis for the film 'On the Line'

2018 
Adrishya
The Steppe Man
ultravoKal

References

External links 
Cult Critic Movie Awards on IMDb

Film festivals established in 2016
Film festivals in India